John Paul II Museum may refer to:

 Museum of John Paul II Collection, Warsaw, Poland
 John Paul II Cathedral Museum, Krakow, Poland